Adé is a commune in the Hautes-Pyrénées department in southwestern France.

Geography

Transport
The N21 road travels through the commune, from north to south. The commune is also immediately adjacent to the south-western end of the Tarbes–Lourdes–Pyrénées Airport, to the north-east, along the N21 road.

Sites and monuments

The chapel of Notre-Dame du Rosaire.
The church of Saint-Hippolyte of Adé and the Basilica of the Immaculate Conception de Lourdes are the works of the same architect. This building with three naves was built on the former feudal motte. The cellar of the rectory is the former armory of the castle which was built in the 11th Century. Inside, a tympanum represents the martyrdom of St. Hippolytus, patron saint of the village.
The old château, of which remain the ancient walls.

Population

See also
Communes of the Hautes-Pyrénées department

References

Communes of Hautes-Pyrénées